Fox News Specialists is  an American news and talk show that aired from May 1 to September 7, 2017, on the Fox News. It featured three permanent hosts, Eric Bolling, Kat Timpf, and Eboni K. Williams, plus two rotating guests, who are called specialists, who discuss current events and political issues. It was created to replace The Five, that Bolling used to be a co-host for, due to that show moving to 9pm ET, in the wake of Bill O'Reilly being forced out at Fox News. The first two guest co-hosts for the first episode were Dallas Mavericks owner Mark Cuban and television producer Mark McKinnon. The first episode also featured an interview, conducted by Bolling, with President Donald Trump. A special edition aired on July 11, 2017, at 11:00 pm ET following an exclusive interview with Donald Trump, Jr. on Hannity.

In August, Fox News suspended Eric Bolling, owing to allegations of sexual misconduct. For about a month afterward, a string of guest hosts, most of them Fox News contributors, sat in for Bolling.  Upon Bolling's ultimate departure from FNC in September, the network canceled Fox News Specialists. In its place, The Five returned to its initial 5 p.m. time slot.

Citations

External links 

Fox News Specialists

Fox News original programming
2017 American television series debuts
2017 American television series endings
2010s American television news shows
Current affairs shows
English-language television shows